Robert Irwin may refer to:

 Robert Irwin (North Carolina politician) (1738–1800), general of the American militia in the Revolutionary War
 Robert Irwin (Canadian politician) (1865–1941), Canadian politician
 Robert Irwin (artist) (born 1928), American installation artist
 Robert Irwin (writer) (born 1946), British historian, novelist and writer on Arabic literature
 Robert Irwin Jr. (1797–1833), United States territorial legislator
 Robert George Irwin (1908–1975), American sculptor convicted in 1937 murder spree in New York City
 Robert Walker Irwin (1844–1925), American businessman and Hawaiian representative to Japan  
 Bob Irwin (born 1939), Australian animal conservationist and father of Steve Irwin ("The Crocodile Hunter")
 Robert Irwin (television personality) (born 2003), son of Steve Irwin and grandson of Bob

See also
Robert Irvine (disambiguation)
Robert Irving (disambiguation)